Al Dhahra Bani Walid is a Libyan football team based in Bani Walid, central Libya. The club plays its home games at Bani Walid Stadium. The club currently plays in the Libyan Second Division (2008–09), having been promoted from the Libyan Third Division last season.

Football clubs in Libya